Alcithoe davegibbsi is a species of medium-sized sea snail, a marine gastropod mollusc in the family Volutidae.

References

 Conchologists of America

Volutidae
Gastropods of New Zealand
Gastropods described in 1999